Joe Hatton Gotay (May 17, 1948 in Ponce, Puerto Rico – July 1, 2022) was a Puerto Rican basketball player who competed in the 1968 Summer Olympics and in the 1972 Summer Olympics.

References

External links
 

1948 births
2022 deaths
Puerto Rican men's basketball players
Olympic basketball players of Puerto Rico
Basketball players at the 1968 Summer Olympics
Basketball players at the 1972 Summer Olympics
Basketball players at the 1971 Pan American Games
Pan American Games medalists in basketball
Pan American Games silver medalists for Puerto Rico
Medalists at the 1971 Pan American Games